Glyphipterix melania is a species of sedge moth in the genus Glyphipterix. It was described by Alexey Diakonoff in 1976. It is found in Japan.

References

Moths described in 1976
Glyphipterigidae
Moths of Japan